Asel or Assel is a given name. It is ultimately derived from the Arabic ‘asal (عَسَل), meaning honey, in use in countries such as Iran, Kazakhstan, Kyrgyzstan, and Turkey. It was among the ten most popular names for newborn girls in Turkey in 2021.
It is also a masculine name in use in Sri Lanka. It may also be derived from other sources.

People
Asel Asleh (1983-2000), Israeli-Arab peace activist killed at a protest during the Second Intifada by Israeli security forces
Assel Jakayeva (born 1980), former Kazakhstan water polo player
Asel Kulathunga (born 1997), Sri Lankan cricketer
Asel Roberts (born 1976), Kazakhstan born American diplomat
Asel Sigera (born 1999), Sri Lankan cricketer
Parke Asel Wilson (1867-1934), American professional baseball player

Notes